Marginella liparozona is a species of colorful small sea snail, a marine gastropod mollusk in the Marginellidae family.

The species is endemic to São Tomé and Príncipe.

References

liparozona
Endemic fauna of São Tomé and Príncipe
Invertebrates of São Tomé and Príncipe
Gastropods described in 1913
Taxonomy articles created by Polbot